Alexi Paul Pitu (born 5 June 2002) is a Romanian professional footballer who plays as a winger for Ligue 2 club Bordeaux.

Pitu started out as a senior in 2018 at Viitorul Constanța, which was merged into Farul Constanța three years later. He totalled over 80 matches in the Liga I combined, before earning a move to French side Bordeaux in 2023.

Internationally, Pitu has represented Romania at several youth levels.

Club career

Viitorul Constanța / Farul Constanța
Pitu made his senior debut for Viitorul Constanța on 12 July 2018, coming on as an 86th-minute substitute for Ianis Hagi in a 2–0 win over Racing FC in the first qualifying round of the UEFA Europa League. Aged 16 and one month, he thus became the youngest Romanian player to make an appearance in a European club competition. Ten days later, he recorded his Liga I debut by playing in a 0–1 loss to Dunărea Călărași.

Pitu became a regular starter at the team after it merged with Farul Constanța in the summer of 2021, amassing 32 league games in the 2021–22 season. On 28 August 2022, he scored his first professional goal in a 3–1 away defeat of five-time defending champions CFR Cluj.

Bordeaux
On 26 January 2023, French team Bordeaux announced the signing of Pitu on a four-and-a-half-year contract, with the transfer fee rumoured to be around €2 million. Two days later, he made his Ligue 2 debut by entering as a 72nd-minute substitute for Josh Maja in a 3–0 away victory over Dijon.

International career 
On 3 March 2023, Pitu received his first official call-up to the Romanian senior national team for the UEFA Euro 2024 qualifying matches against Andorra and Belarus.

Personal life
Pitu's paternal uncle, Adrian, was also a professional footballer.

Career statistics

Club

Honours
Viitorul Constanța
Cupa României: 2018–19
Supercupa României: 2019

References

External links

2002 births
Living people
Footballers from Karlsruhe
Romanian footballers
Romania youth international footballers
German footballers
German people of Romanian descent
Romanian people of Aromanian descent
Aromanian sportspeople
Association football wingers
Liga I players
FC Viitorul Constanța players
FCV Farul Constanța players
Ligue 2 players
FC Girondins de Bordeaux players
Expatriate footballers in France
Romanian expatriate sportspeople in France